Burt L. Grossman (born April 10, 1967) is a former American football defensive end in the National Football League (NFL).

Biography
Before becoming a professional, Grossman played college football at the University of Pittsburgh where he was a three-time All-ECAC selection. In 1989, he was drafted by the San Diego Chargers. 

Grossman played six seasons in the NFL: five for the San Diego Chargers (1989–1993) and one for the Philadelphia Eagles (1994). As an NFL player, Grossman's accomplishments include forty-five quarterback sacks and three safeties.

Grossman appeared on the October 15, 1990, edition cover of Sports Illustrated under the title "Big Mouth," which chronicled his outspoken and outlandish personality.  In 1996, he suffered a career-ending neck injury.

After football, Grossman was hired by WCAU in Philadelphia for its program, Eagles Hour.  The program won an Emmy in 1995, as well as earning him an Emmy as best sports reporter.  In 1996, he published the book The Way Things Ought to Be with Bill Kushner.  Currently, he is a contributor for the website "The National Football Post."

In 2019, he became the head coach of the San Diego Strike Force in the Indoor Football League. The team went 1–13 in his first season. The team played one game, a 50–36 win over the Bismarck Bucks, before the 2020 season was cancelled due to the COVID-19 pandemic. San Diego then withdrew from the 2021 season due to the pandemic and Grossman did not return to the Strike Force for the 2022 season.

He is a cousin of former Pittsburgh Steelers tight end Randy Grossman.

References

1967 births
American football defensive ends
Jewish American sportspeople
Players of American football from Pennsylvania
Philadelphia Eagles players
San Diego Chargers players
Pittsburgh Panthers football players
Living people
Archbishop John Carroll High School alumni
21st-century American Jews